Agelena funerea is a species of spider in the family Agelenidae, which contains at least 1,315 species of funnel-web spiders . It was first described by Simon, in 1909. It is primarily found in East Africa.

References 

funerea
Spiders described in 1909
Spiders of Africa